The QED vacuum or quantum electrodynamic vacuum is the field-theoretic vacuum of quantum electrodynamics. It is the lowest energy state (the ground state) of the electromagnetic field when the fields are quantized. When Planck's constant is hypothetically allowed to approach zero, QED vacuum is converted to classical vacuum, which is to say, the vacuum of classical electromagnetism.

Another field-theoretic vacuum is the QCD vacuum of the Standard Model.

Fluctuations

The QED vacuum is subject to fluctuations about a dormant zero average-field condition; Here is a description of the quantum vacuum:

Virtual particles 

It is sometimes attempted to provide an intuitive picture of virtual particles based upon the Heisenberg energy-time uncertainty principle:

This interpretation of the energy-time uncertainty relation is not universally accepted, however. One issue is the use of an uncertainty relation limiting measurement accuracy as though a time uncertainty  determines a "budget" for borrowing energy .  Another issue is the meaning of "time" in this relation, because energy and time (unlike position  and momentum , for example) do not satisfy a canonical commutation relation (such as ). Various schemes have been advanced to construct an observable that has some kind of time interpretation, and yet does satisfy a canonical commutation relation with energy. The many approaches to the energy-time uncertainty principle are a continuing subject of study.

Quantization of the fields

The Heisenberg uncertainty principle does not allow a particle to exist in a state in which the particle is simultaneously at a fixed location, say the origin of coordinates, and has also zero momentum. Instead the particle has a range of momentum and spread in location attributable to quantum fluctuations; if confined, it has a zero-point energy.

An uncertainty principle applies to all quantum mechanical operators that do not commute. In particular, it applies also to the electromagnetic field. A digression follows to flesh out the role of commutators for the electromagnetic field.
The standard approach to the quantization of the electromagnetic field begins by introducing a vector potential  and a scalar potential  to represent the basic electromagnetic electric field  and magnetic field  using the relations:  The vector potential is not completely determined by these relations, leaving open a so-called gauge freedom. Resolving this ambiguity using the Coulomb gauge leads to a description of the electromagnetic fields in the absence of charges in terms of the vector potential and the momentum field , given by:  where  is the electric constant of the SI units. Quantization is achieved by insisting that the momentum field and the vector potential do not commute. The notation  denotes the commutator.

Because of the non-commutation of field variables, the variances of the fields cannot be zero, although their averages are zero. The electromagnetic field has therefore a zero-point energy, and a lowest quantum state. The interaction of an excited atom with this lowest quantum state of the electromagnetic field is what leads to spontaneous emission, the transition of an excited atom to a state of lower energy by emission of a photon even when no external perturbation of the atom is present.

Electromagnetic properties

As a result of quantization, the quantum electrodynamic vacuum can be considered as a material medium. It is capable of vacuum polarization. In particular, the force law between charged particles is affected. The electrical permittivity of quantum electrodynamic vacuum can be calculated, and it differs slightly from the simple  of the classical vacuum. This medium is a dielectric with relative dielectric constant > 1, and is diamagnetic, with relative magnetic permeability < 1. Under some extreme circumstances in which the field exceeds the Schwinger limit (for example, in the very high fields found in the exterior regions of pulsars), the quantum electrodynamic vacuum is thought to exhibit nonlinearity in the fields. Calculations also indicate birefringence and dichroism at high fields. Many of electromagnetic effects of the vacuum are small, and only recently have experiments been designed to enable the observation of nonlinear effects. PVLAS and other teams are working towards the needed sensitivity to detect QED effects.

Attainability
A perfect vacuum is itself only attainable in principle. It is an idealization, like absolute zero for temperature, that can be approached, but never actually realized:

Virtual particles make a perfect vacuum unrealizable, but leave open the question of attainability of a quantum electrodynamic vacuum or QED vacuum. Predictions of QED vacuum such as spontaneous emission, the Casimir effect and the Lamb shift have been experimentally verified, suggesting QED vacuum is a good model for a high quality realizable vacuum. There are competing theoretical models for vacuum, however. For example, quantum chromodynamic vacuum includes many virtual particles not treated in quantum electrodynamics. The vacuum of quantum gravity treats gravitational effects not included in the Standard Model. It remains an open question whether further refinements in experimental technique ultimately will support another model for realizable vacuum.

See also
Feynman diagram
History of quantum field theory
Precision tests of QED

References

Vacuum
Electromagnetism
Electromagnetic radiation
Energy (physics)
Concepts in physics
Quantum electrodynamics
Articles containing video clips